Ministry for Internal Affairs of Ingushetia (Министерство внутренних дел по Ингуше́тия Республике) is the official name of the Ingushetia's Police.

Subordinated directly to the Russian Interior Ministry and the President of Ingushetia. Current local minister is Alexander Trofimov (Since June 2011).

The Main Headquarters is in embattled Magas.

Structure
 Investigations (Следственное управление)
 Information (Информационный центр)
 Economic Security and Anti-Corruption Directorate (Управление экономической безопасности и противодействия коррупции)

See also
Civil war in Ingushetia

External links
Official Website

Politics of Ingushetia
Ingushetia
Ingushetia